Grace A.M.E. Zion Church is a historic African Methodist Episcopal Zion church located in what was once the Brooklyn neighborhood of  Charlotte, Mecklenburg County, North Carolina.  It was built in 1901–1902, and is a Gothic Revival style brick church.  The front facade features two crenellated entry towers of unequal height with matching Gothic arched entrances.  It is one of the oldest of the remaining African American churches associated with Charlotte's historic black districts.

It was added to the National Register of Historic Places in 2008 and is at 219-223 S. Brevard Street. The congregation relocated when Brooklyn was razed in the 1960s for an urban renewal program. The church is one of the few remaining buildings in the area from the neighborhood.

The church was designed by the Charlotte architectural firm of Hayden, Wheeler and Schwend and built by contractor William W. Smith, an African American.

See also
National Register of Historic Places listings in Mecklenburg County, North Carolina

References

African-American history in Charlotte, North Carolina
Churches in Charlotte, North Carolina
African Methodist Episcopal Zion churches in North Carolina
Churches on the National Register of Historic Places in North Carolina
Churches completed in 1902
20th-century Methodist church buildings in the United States
National Register of Historic Places in Mecklenburg County, North Carolina